Ruth Gordon (1896–1985) was an American film, stage, and television actress.

Ruth Gordon may also refer to:

Ruth E. Gordon (1910–2003), American bacteriologist
Ruth Gordon, a minor character in the Brookside soap opera
Ruth Schnapp née Gordon, (1926–2014), American structural engineer